Igor Rurikovich (died 945) was a Rurikid ruler of Kievan Rus' from 912 to 945.

Biography
Information about Igor comes mostly from the Primary Chronicle. This document has Igor as the son of Rurik, the first ruler of Kievan Rus':

6378–6387 (870–879). On his deathbed, Rurik bequeathed his realm to Oleg, who belonged to his kin, and entrusted to Oleg's hands his son Igor', for he was very young.

6388–6390 (880–882). Oleg set forth, taking with him many warriors from among the Varangians, the Chuds, the Slavs, the Merians and all the Krivichians. He thus arrived with his Krivichians before Smolensk, captured the city, and set up a garrison there. Thence he went on and captured Lyubech, where he also set up a garrison. He then came to the hills of Kiev, and saw how Askold and Dir reigned there. He hid his warriors in the boats, left some others behind, and went forward himself bearing the child Igor'. He thus came to the foot of the Hungarian hill, and after concealing his troops, he sent messengers to Askold and Dir, representing himself as a stranger on his way to Greece on an errand for Oleg and for Igor', the prince's son, and requesting that they should come forth to greet them as members of their race. Askold and Dir straightway came forth. Then all the soldiery jumped out of the boats, and Oleg said to Askold and Dir, "You are not princes nor even of princely stock, but I am of princely birth." Igor' was then brought forward, and Oleg announced that he was the son of Rurik. They killed Askold and Dir, and after carrying them to the hill, they buried them there, on the hill now known as Hungarian, where the castle of Ol'ma now stands.

Igor twice besieged Constantinople in 941 and 944, and although Greek fire destroyed part of his fleet, he concluded with the Byzantine Emperor Constantine VII a favourable treaty (945), the text of which the chronicle has preserved. In 913 and 944 the Rus' plundered the Arabs in the Caspian Sea during the Caspian expeditions of the Rus', but it remains unclear whether Igor had anything to do with these campaigns.

Igor was killed while collecting tribute from the Drevlians in 945. The Byzantine historian and chronicler Leo the Deacon (born ca 950) describes how Igor met his death: "They had bent down two birch trees to the prince's feet and tied them to his legs; then they let the trees straighten again, thus tearing the prince's body apart." Igor's widow, Olga of Kiev, avenged his death by punishing the Drevlians. The Primary Chronicle blames his death on his own excessive greed, indicating that he tried to collect tribute for a second time in a month. As a result, Olga changed the system of tribute gathering (poliudie) in what may be regarded as the first legal reform recorded in Eastern Europe.

Controversy
Drastically revising the chronology of the Primary Chronicle, Constantin Zuckerman argues that Igor actually reigned for three years, between summer 941 and his death in early 945. Zuckerman argues that the 33-year reign attributed to Igor in the Chronicle is the result of its author's faulty interpretation of Byzantine sources. Indeed, none of Igor's activities recorded in the Chronicle is dated before 941.

Referring to the Ioachim Chronicle, Vasily Tatishchev argues that the Swedish princess Efanda, whose existence has been questioned by many historians, was Igor's mother. According to Tatishchev, the name "Ingor" comes from the Finnish (Izhora) name Inger. Tatishchev also gives Igor's birth dates from various manuscripts: 875 in the Schismatic manuscript, 861 in the Nizhny Novgorod manuscript, 865 in the Orenburg manuscript.

See also

List of Ukrainian rulers
List of Russian rulers

References

Sources 
 

9th-century births
945 deaths
Rulers of Kievan Rus'
Varangians
Rurik dynasty
10th-century princes in Kievan Rus'
Germanic pagans
Grand Princes of Kiev
Dismemberments